Emo's, formerly known as The Back Room, is a music and event venue located in Austin, Texas. Emo's got its start as a Houston punk club in 1989, with the Austin location opening in 1992. The Houston location closed its doors in September 2001.

The nightclub is an official South by Southwest Music Festival venue, during which it consists of four stages. The annual Emissions from the Monolith festival relocated to Emo's in 2007. The club closed in December 2011 for reasons unknown, however in September of that same year, a new venue opened up on East Riverside, on the site of the old Back Room venue.

On February 11, 2013, Emo's announced they were being sold to C3 Presents, the booking agent/production company behind Austin City Limits Festival and Lollapalooza, among other endeavors.

Notable performers 
 Devo (1988-12-02)

See also
Music of Austin, Texas

References

External links
Emo's

Music of Austin, Texas
Music venues in Austin, Texas